The 2018 Davis Cup World Group Play-offs were held from 14 to 16 September. They were the main play-offs of the 2018 Davis Cup. The winners of the playoffs advance as seeded to the 2019 Davis Cup Qualifying Round.


Teams
Bold indicates team had qualified as seeded to the 2019 Davis Cup Qualifying Round.

From World Group
 
 
 
 
 
 
 
 

 From Americas Group I

 
 

 From Asia/Oceania Group I

 
 

 From Europe/Africa Group I

Results summary
Date: 14–16 September

The eight losing teams in the World Group first round ties and eight winners of the Zonal Group I final round ties competed in the World Group Play-offs for spots in the 2019 Qualifying Round.  The draw took place on April 10 in London.

Seeded teams

 
 
 
 
 
 
 
 

Unseeded teams

Play-off results

Argentina vs. Colombia

Great Britain vs. Uzbekistan

Austria vs. Australia

Switzerland vs. Sweden

Serbia vs. India

Canada vs. Netherlands

Hungary vs. Czech Republic

Japan vs. Bosnia and Herzegovina

References
 Davis Cup Tennis 2018: Final Scores and Results from Round 1 Bracket

World Group Play-offs